Univision is an American Spanish language broadcast television television network owned by Univision Communications, which was launched in 1962 as the Spanish International Network (SIN). , the network currently has 27 owned-and-operated stations and current affiliation agreements with 37 other television stations. Univision maintains a national cable network feed that is distributed directly to cable, satellite and IPTV providers in various media markets not listed in this article, as an alternative method of distribution in areas without either the availability or the demand for a locally based owned-and-operated or affiliate station.

This article is a listing of current Univision affiliates in the continental United States and U.S. possessions (including subchannel affiliates, satellite stations and select low-power translators), arranged alphabetically by state, and based on the station's city of license and followed in parentheses by the Designated Market Area if it differs from the city of license. There are links to and articles on each of the broadcast stations, describing their histories, local programming and technical information, such as broadcast frequencies.

The station's advertised channel number follows the call letters. In most cases, this is their virtual channel (PSIP) number.

Stations listed in boldface are owned and operated by Univision through its corporate parent's broadcasting subsidiary Univision Television Group (excluding owned-and-operated stations of sister network UniMás, unless the station simulcasts a co-owned Univision O&O station via a digital subchannel).

United States

Alabama
 none

Alaska
 none

Arizona
 Tucson–Green Valley – KUVE-DT 46, 38
 Phoenix – KTVW-DT 33

Arkansas
 Fort Smith – KQRY-LD 36
 Little Rock – KLRA-CD 20
 Winslow (Fayetteville) – KWNL-CD 31

California
 Bakersfield – KABE-CD 39 / KUVI-DT 45.2 (simulcast of KABE-CD)
 Chico (Redding) – KUCO-LD 27
 El Centro (Yuma, Arizona) – KVYE 7
 Eureka – KEUV-LD 31
 Hanford (Fresno) – KFTV-DT 21
 Indio – KVER-CD 41
 Los Angeles – KMEX-DT 34
 Modesto (Sacramento) – KUVS-DT 19
 Monterey (Salinas) – KSMS-TV 67
 Palm Springs – KVES-LD 28 (simulcast of KVER-CD)
 San Francisco – KDTV-DT 14
 San Diego – KBNT-CD 17.1 / KHAX-LD 17
 Santa Barbara – KPMR 38

Colorado
 Denver – KCEC 14
 Pueblo (Colorado Springs) – KVSN 48

Connecticut
 Hartford – WUVN 18

Delaware
 Wilmington – WUVP-DT 65
 none

District of Columbia
 Washington, D.C. – WFDC-DT 14
 none

Florida
 Melbourne (Orlando) – WVEN-TV 43
 Fort Myers – WUVF-LD 2 / WLZE-LD 51
 Miami – WLTV-DT 23
 Venice (Tampa) – WVEA-TV 50

Georgia
 Athens (Atlanta) – WUVG-DT 34

Idaho
 none

Illinois
 Joliet (Chicago) – WGBO-DT 66

Indiana

 none

Iowa
 none

Kansas
 Derby (Wichita) – KDCU-DT 31
 Kansas City – KUKC-LD 20

Kentucky
 none

Louisiana
 none

Maine
 none

Maryland

 none

Massachusetts
 Marlborough (Boston) – WUNI 66

Michigan
 none

Minnesota
 Minneapolis–St. Paul – WUMN-LD 17

Mississippi
 none

Missouri
 Kansas City – KUKC-LD 20

Montana
 none

Nebraska
 none

Nevada
 Las Vegas – KINC 15
 Reno – KREN-TV 27

New Hampshire
 none

New Jersey
 Vineland (Philadelphia) – WUVP-DT 65
 Paterson (New York City) – WXTV-DT 41

New Mexico
 Albuquerque – KLUZ-TV 14
 Las Cruces – KINT-TV 26

New York
 New York City – WXTV-DT 41
 none

North Carolina
 Fayetteville (Raleigh–Durham) – WUVC-DT 40

North Dakota
 none

Ohio
 Cleveland – WQHS-DT 61

Oklahoma
 Oklahoma City–Shawnee–Woodward –KUOK 36,30
 Tulsa – KUTU-CD 25

Oregon
 La Grande - Portland – KUNP / KUNP-LP 16, 47

Pennsylvania
 Philadelphia – WUVP-DT 65

Rhode Island
 none

South Carolina
 none

South Dakota
 none

Tennessee
 Nashville – WLLC-LD 42

Texas
 Corpus Christi – KORO 28
 El Paso – KINT-TV 26
 Garland (Dallas–Fort Worth) – KUVN-DT 23
 Killeen (Waco and Austin) – KAKW-DT 62
 Laredo – KLDO-TV 27
 Lubbock – KBZO-LD 51
 McAllen – KNVO 48
 Midland – KUPB 18
 Rosenberg (Houston) – KXLN-DT 45
 San Angelo – KEUS-LD 41
 San Antonio – KWEX-DT 41
 Victoria – KUNU-LP 21

Utah
 Provo (Salt Lake City) – KUTH-DT 32

Vermont
 none

Virginia

 none

Washington
 Bellevue (Seattle) – KUNS-TV 51
 Kennewick–Walla Walla–Yakima –KUNW-CD 15, 16, 2

West Virginia
 none

Wisconsin
 none

Wyoming
 none

U.S. territories

Puerto Rico
 Aguadilla – WOLE-DT 12
 Caguas (San Juan) – WLII-DT 11
 Mayaguez – W21CX-D 21 (translator of WOLE-DT)
 Ponce – WSUR-DT 9 (satellite of WLII-DT)

Notes and references

Station notes

References

Univision